The Hollywood Music in Media Award for Best Original Song in an Animated Film is one of the awards given annually to people working in the motion picture industry by the Hollywood Music in Media Awards (HMMA). It is presented to the songwriters who have composed the best "original" song, written specifically for an animated film. The award was first given in 2014, during the fifth annual awards.

Notes
≈ indicates an Academy Award for Best Original Song nominee

Winners and nominees

2010s

2020s

References

Best Original Song in an Animated Film
Film awards for Best Song
Awards established in 2014